In Hawaiian mythology, Kuhimana was a god of soothsayers.

Historian David Malo said that "soothsayers and those who studied the signs of the heavens (kilokilo) worshipped the god Kuhimana."

He was also called god of astrologers.

Notes 

Hawaiian gods
Oracular gods